The Elgin Regiment (RCAC) (previously known as The Elgin Regiment until 1954) was an armoured regiment of the Canadian Army Reserve. First raised in the 1860s as an infantry regiment, it became an armoured unit during the Second World War and again during the Cold War. In 1997, the regiment was converted from armour to combat engineers and exists today as the 31 Combat Engineer Regiment (The Elgin's).

Lineage

The Elgin Regiment (RCAC) 

 Originated on 14 September 1866, in St. Thomas, Canada West, as the 25th Elgin Battalion of Infantry.
 Redesignated on 8 May 1900, as the 25th Elgin Regiment.
 Redesignated on 17 May 1904, as the 25th Regiment.
 Redesignated on 29 March 1920, as The Elgin Regiment.
 Redesignated on 7 November 1940, as The Elgin Regiment (Reserve).
 Redesignated on 15 February 1946, as The Elgin Regiment, RCIC.
 Converted to armour on 1 October 1954, and redesignated as The Elgin Regiment (27th Armoured Regiment).
 Redesignated on 19 May 1958, as The Elgin Regiment (RCAC).
 Converted to engineers on 14 August 1997, and redesignated as the 31 Combat Engineer Regiment (The Elgin's).

Perpetuations 

 91st Battalion (Elgin), CEF

Organization

25th Elgin Battalion of Infantry (14 September 1866) 

 No. 1 Company (St. Thomas) (first raised on 17 July 1856 as The 1st Volunteer Militia Rifle Company of St. Thomas)
 No. 2 Company (Port Stanley) (first raised on 31 January 1862 as the Port Stanley Volunteer Marine Company)
 No. 3 Company (Vienna) (first raised on 29 October 1862 as the Vienna Volunteer Militia Company of Infantry)
 No. 4 Company (Tillsonburg) (first raised on 13 July 1866 as the Tillsonburg Infantry Company)
 No. 5 Company (Aylmer) (first raised on 8 June 1866 as the Aylmer Infantry Company)

The Elgin Regiment (15 February 1921) 

 1st Battalion (perpetuating the 91st Battalion, CEF)
 A Company (St. Thomas)
 B Company (St. Thomas)
 C Company (St. Thomas)
 D Company (Aylmer)
 2nd (Reserve) Battalion

25th Armoured Delivery Regiment (The Elgin Regiment) (1943-1945) 

 A Squadron (1st Canadian Armoured Brigade)
 B Squadron (1st Canadian Armoured Brigade)
 C Squadron (2nd Canadian Armoured Brigade)
 D Squadron (4th Canadian Armoured Division)
 E Squadron (II Canadian Corps)
 F Squadron (First Canadian Army)
 G Squadron (5th Canadian Armoured Division)
 H Squadron (I Canadian Corps)

Alliances 

 The Royal Northumberland Fusiliers (Until 1968)
 The Royal Regiment of Fusiliers (1968-1997)

Battle Honours

Great War 

 Somme, 1916
 Arras, 1917
 Ypres, 1917
 Amiens

Second World War 

 Sicily 1943
 Italy 1943-1945
 North-West Europe 1944-1945

References 

Former infantry regiments of Canada
Military units and formations of Ontario